Gándara Island is an island immediately southwest of Kopaitic Island in the Duroch Islands of Antarctica. The name appears on a Chilean government chart of 1959. It was presumably named for Comodoro Jorge Gándara, the leader of the 1954–55 Chilean Antarctic Expedition.

See also 
 List of Antarctic and sub-Antarctic islands

References

Islands of the Duroch Islands